Jorus may refer to:
 Joruus C'Baoth, a clone of the Jedi Master Jorus C'Baoth in the Star Wars universe
 Jorus, a character in the Forgotten Realms Dungeons and Dragon universe